Eakantham is a 2006 Indian Malayalam-language feature film directed by Madhu Kaithapram, who made his debut. The film stars veteran actors Thilakan and Murali. It tells the story of two brothers who suffer from isolation and loneliness in their old age. It received critical praise and won many awards including two National Film Awards and a Kerala State Film Award.

Plot
Achutha Menon and Ravunni Menon are brothers who part ways when they were young. However, they mend fences when age catches up with them and become thick friends. Achutha Menon is shattered by the demise of his wife who had stood by him through thick and thin for the last 40 years. Ravunni Menon's woes are worse; after the death of his wife, his children neglect him. Ravunni Menon is also suffering from a terminal illness. The film ends on an emotional note.

Cast
 Thilakan as Achutha Menon
 Murali as Ravunni Menon
 Salim Kumar as Velayudhan
 Manoj K. Jayan as Dr. Sunny
 Madhupal
 Meera Vasudev as Dr. Sophy
 Bindu Panicker
 Roslin as Velayudhan's mother
 Shobha Mohan as Mother Superior

Awards
 National Film Awards (2007)
 Indira Gandhi Award for Best Debut Film of a Director - Madhu Kaithapram
 Special Jury Award - Thilakan

 Kerala State Film Awards (2006)
 Special Jury Award - Madhu Kaithapram

Soundtrack
Music by Kaithapram Viswanathan and Lyrics by Kaithapram Damodaran Namboothiri.
 Kaiyyethum Doore Oru Kuttikkalam - K. J. Yesudas

References

External links
 

2006 films
2000s Malayalam-language films
Films directed by Madhu Kaithapram
Best Debut Feature Film of a Director National Film Award winners